The Saint Vincent and the Grenadines Coast Guard (abbreviated as the SVG Coast Guard) is the maritime security and search and rescue element of the Royal Saint Vincent and the Grenadines Police Force. It was founded on 2 December 1980, when eight Police Force officers underwent training at the Royal Naval Engineering College in the United Kingdom.

Operations 

On 14 October 2022, a patrol boat of the SVG Coast Guard intercepted and boarded a pirogue west of the island of Canouan.

Organization 
The SVG Coast Guard consists of approximately 55 servicemembers trained in Barbados, Antigua, the United States, or the United Kingdom.

On 1 April 1984, the SVG Coast Guard adopted the blue uniforms of the SVG Police Force, but differentiated its rank structure to follow a naval system similar to that of the Royal Navy. Its headquarters and main docks is in Kingstown on Saint Vincent, but it also operates several other bases on Calliaqua, Union Island, Bequia, and Canouan.

Ships 
The  was the first patrol boat in the SVG Coast Guard, built in and funded by the United Kingdom. It was accepted on 21 November 1981, and immediately began search and rescue operations, saving the crew of the sinking motor vessel Simone V in January 1982. The Canadian government funded two additional  patrol boats in October 1982, which were built domestically in Saint Vincent and the Grenadines and were called Larakai and Brighton. The , a  patrol boat, arrived in Saint Vincent and the Grenadines in 1987 after sailing from the United States, which funded and upkeeps the vessel. The Captain Hugh Mulzac became the new flagship of the Coast Guard, and is operates in both maritime security and search and rescue roles. In more recent years, the small boats Larakai and Brighton were decommissioned, and were replaced by several rigid hull inflatable boats and the larger patrol boat Hairoun. The need for a sea ambulance was filled in October 2019, when the Balliceaux arrived as a new ship in the fleet.

References 

Coast guards
Military of Saint Vincent and the Grenadines